The Popery Act (Penal Law) of 1704 required land held (typically in tenancy) by Roman Catholics to be divided equally between all a landholder's sons, both legitimate and illegitimate, on his death.  This had formerly been normal under the law of gavelkind, a law abolished by the Dublin administration in 1604.  Known as
sub-division, this inheritance practice continued by tradition until the middle of the 19th century.

The growth of population inevitably caused subdivision. Population grew from a level of about 500,000 in 1000 AD to about 2 million by 1700, and 5 million by 1800. On the eve of the Great Famine the population of Ireland had risen to 8 million, most people living on ever-smaller farms and depending on the potato as a staple diet.

By the 1840s, many farms had become so small that the only food source that could be grown in sufficient quantity to feed a family was potatoes. This was to have disastrous effects when, in the period 1847-50 a series of potato blight struck, making much of the potatoes grown inedible. This period came to be known as the Great Famine and led to the deaths of a million people.

From the 1870s the practice arose of passing a holding to one child only, which with the benefits of the Irish Land Acts, meant that the survivors prospered.

A secondary effect of the prohibition of sub-division was that other children, who would previously have inherited part of the family farm tenancy or married into a similar small farm, were forced to seek employment elsewhere. Many emigrated. Many entered religious life, as Roman Catholic priests, nuns or monks, such options becoming available due to a re-organisation of the Roman Catholic Church in Ireland under Cardinal Cullen from the 1850s. This influx of young people into the religious life, thanks to the disappearance of sub-division, in part explains the massive growth in clerical numbers in Ireland in the period.

Irish landholdings underwent further massive change in the period between the 1880s and the 1930s when a series of Land Acts by the Irish Land Commission and Congested Districts Board for Ireland broke up the previous large estates from which tenant farmers rented property and who were empowered by British and (later) Irish government grants and loans to buy their farms instead of renting them.

 Landlord and Tenant (Ireland) Act 1870: this had little if any practical effect.
 Land Law (Ireland) Act 1881: Gave tenants real security ("the Three Fs": Fair Rent, Fixity of Tenure and Free Sale).  It was too little, too late: by this time the Irish were demanding full proprietorship.
 Land Purchase (Ireland) Act 1903: offered generous inducement to landlords to sell their estates to the Land Commission, which would then collect land annuities instead of rents.

See also
Irish Land League
Land Commission

Footnotes

Land reform in Ireland